Femi David Lasisi Bamigboye (7 December 1940 – 21 September 2018) was a Nigerian military commander and politician of Kwara State from May 1967 to July 1975, after it had been split from the old Northern Region during the military regime of General Yakubu Gowon.

David Bamigboye is a member of the Igbomina ethnic group.
His younger brother is Theophilus Bamigboye, another military ruler turned politician.

In 1968 he created the Kwara State Ministry of Education, with a department to handle Scholarship/Bursary matters.
In 1971 he announced a decision to establish the Kwara State Polytechnic, which came into existence in 1972.
In December 1972 he opened the new premises of Ola-Olu Hospital with accommodation for thirty-five beds.

In 1977, some properties he owned in Ilorin were seized, not to be returned until 26 years later in May 2003.

In 2009, his son, Femi David Bamigboye was appointed special assistant to the Kwara State governor.

Awards
Outstanding Leadership Award was conferred on Bamigboye by the Governor of Kwara State, Abdulfatah Ahmed on 27 May 2017.

References

1940 births
2018 deaths
Yoruba military personnel
Governors of Kwara State
Nigerian generals
Yoruba politicians
Kwara State University people